Maciej Okręglak (born 5 July 1993, in Nowy Sącz) is a Polish slalom canoeist who has competed at the international level since 2009.

He won a bronze medal in K1 team event at the 2017 European Championships in Tacen. He finished in 18th place in the K1 event at the 2016 Summer Olympics in Rio de Janeiro.

References

External links 
 Maciej OKREGLAK at CanoeSlalom.net

1993 births
Living people
Polish male canoeists
Olympic canoeists of Poland
Canoeists at the 2016 Summer Olympics
Sportspeople from Nowy Sącz